The Kyiv River Port (translit. Kyivskyi richkovyi port) is the main river port of Kyiv, located on the right bank of the Dnieper River in the Podil neighborhood of the city. The port has an own fleet that serves as a shipping company. It also has departments in Pereiaslav and Rzhyshchiv.

The passenger part of the port has been renovated to house American University of Kyiv since 2021.

History

Since ancient times the Podil neighborhood was an important trade center, especially by water routes.

Around the 19th century, steamboats started to navigate along the Dnieper, and a row of quays were built along the Right Bank of the river.

Port infrastructure

Freight and shipbuilding infrastructure

Passenger infrastructure

Kyiv River Port boasts more than 20 riverboat stairway-equipped moorings on the several kilometer-long embankment, all of which are reserved for passenger and leisure vessels. From April through October, there is a daily leisure navigation in the port, facilitated by various private operators.

Passenger terminal of the port
In 1953–1961 a new passenger terminal was built on the Poshtova Square by the architects V. Gopkalo, V. Ladny, and others. The building has a mast-like tower which resembled a steamboat tower.

Fleet

Passenger
 Moskva-type - 6 (all project R-51E)
 Kashtan-type - 4 
 Moskvich-type - 2 (all project 544)
 PS-type - 1 (project 792A)

Freight
 Project 1021A - 1
 TNM-type, project 795 - 1
 Zaporozhie-type, project 559B - 1
 Generic - 2
 Project 775, 775A - 7

Technical
 Type BT, BM - 6
 Floating dock - 1
 Floating piers - 3
 Poliarnik-type, project 1427 - 1
 Type OS, project 354U - 1
 Project 889A - 1
 Project D-120 - 1
 Admiralteets-type, project 371 - 1
 Kostromich-type, project 1606 - 1

Ownership and operations

The port was privatized in 1996 from Ukrrichflot. It is now owned by companies associated with Mykhailo Brodskyi and Nestor Shufrych.

See also
Kyiv River Station
Mosaics of Kyiv River Station
Pereiaslav River Port
Rzhyshchiv River Port
Podilsko-Voskresensky Bridge
Havanskyi Bridge
Desna River
KDM Shipping
List of ports in Ukraine
Transport in Ukraine

Further reading
 Ruta Malikenaite. Guildebook: Touring Kyiv. Kyiv: Baltia Druk, 2003.

References

External links
 Official website
 List of ships

Transportation buildings and structures in Kyiv
Tourist attractions in Kyiv
Shipping companies of Ukraine
Podilskyi District
River ports of Ukraine